Platysulcus is an eukaryotic microorganism that was recently discovered to be the earliest diverging lineage of the Heterokont phylogenetic tree. It is the only member of the family Platysulcidae, order Platysulcida and class Platysulcea, of uncertain taxonomic position within the phylum Bigyra. It contains the only species P. tardus.

Morphology
Platysulcus is a gliding biflagellate, with a short anterior flagellum, a long posterior flagellum, and a flagellar apparatus typical of stramenopiles. It has tubular mastigonemes on the anterior flagellum. It contains mitochondria with tubular cristae. The basal body and the transitional region of the flagella lack ring-shaped or helical structures. The two flagellar roots consist of 11 microtubules forming an “L”-shape.

Its cells are oval or ovoid in shape, around 5.62 μm in length and 3.76 μm in width. The anterior flagellum is around 9 μm in length, and the posterior measures around 17 μm. They contain extrusomes and a large, flat vesicle surrounding the cytoplasm where the nucleus, mitochondria, and microbodies are found.

Ecology
Platysulcus was isolated from sedimented detritus on seaweed collected near Ngeruktabel Island, Palau. It is a free-living phagotrophic protist, bacterivorous and marine.

Phylogeny and taxonomy

Phylogeny
Phylogenetic analyses recover Platysulcea as the earliest diverging lineage of Stramenopiles, sister to a clade containing Bigyra and Gyrista.

Taxonomy
Despite the phylogenetic results, Platysulcea has been classified as part of the phylum Bigyra.
Class Platysulcea 
Order Platysulcida 
Family Platysulcidae 
Platysulcus 
P. tardus

References

External links

 

Heterokont genera